Edgar Charles Hardy (born March 11, 1951) is a former American football offensive guard who played in the National Football League (NFL) for the San Francisco 49ers.

The 49ers drafted Hardy out of Jackson State in the seventh round of the 1972 NFL Draft with the 175th overall pick.  He was placed on the 49ers' taxi squad for the 1972 season.  In 1973 he was injured in training camp but was activated later in the season and played in three games for the 49ers – October 14 against the Minnesota Vikings, October 21 against the New Orleans Saints and October 28 against the Atlanta Falcons. His season was cut short ny a knee injury and he required surgery in the offseason.  His NFL career ended when he injured his knee again in a 1974 49ers preseason game against the Kansas City Chiefs.

References

1951 births
Living people
American football offensive guards
Jackson State Tigers football players
San Francisco 49ers players
People from Magee, Mississippi
People from Mendenhall, Mississippi
Players of American football from Mississippi